Senator Mazzei may refer to:

Frank Mazzei (1912–1977), Pennsylvania State Senate
Mike Mazzei (born 1965), Oklahoma State Senate

See also
Senator Massie (disambiguation)
Senator Massey (disambiguation)